General Austin may refer to:

Fred Thaddeus Austin (1866–1938), U.S. Army major general
Herbert Henry Austin (1868–1937), British Army brigadier general
Lloyd Austin (born 1953), U.S. Army four-star general
Richard G. Austin (politician) (born 1948), Adjutant General of Illinois
Staryl C. Austin (1920–2015), U.S. Air Force brigadier general